Carliol Square railway station served the city of Newcastle upon Tyne, Tyne and Wear, England, from 1839 to 1850 on the Newcastle and North Shields Railway.

History 
The station opened on 22 June 1839 by the Newcastle and North Shields Railway. It was the southern terminus of the line until  opened on 30 August 1850.

References

External links 

Disused railway stations in Tyne and Wear
Railway stations in Great Britain opened in 1839
Railway stations in Great Britain closed in 1850
1839 establishments in England
1850 disestablishments in England